Roderick Travers (9 May 1831 – 19 July 1894) was a sheep farmer and member of the Queensland Legislative Assembly.

Early days
Travers was born in Islington, London, and sailed on the Blackwall from Portsmouth to Australia in 1850. He returned to London in 1852 and did not return to Australia until 1862. He acquired and ran several different stations in New South Wales and Queensland until his return to London around 1889. He helped found the Central Queensland Meat Export Co. Ltd in Rockhampton in 1880.

Political career
After the resignation of Sydney Davis as the state member for Clermont in 1866, Travers was elected to take his place. He declined to take his seat in parliament believing that he did not have sufficient time at his disposal to permit his accepting the appointment and resigned a month later.

Personal life
On the 29 August 1863, Travers married Charlotte Owen at Tamworth and together had one son and one daughter. Charlotte died at sea on her way south from Rockhampton in 1867.

He married again on the 17 August 1872 in Caulfield, Victoria to Amy Stephen and together had three sons and two daughters.

Travers died in Kensington, London, on the 19 July 1894.

References

Members of the Queensland Legislative Assembly
1831 births
1894 deaths
19th-century Australian politicians
19th-century Australian businesspeople
19th-century English businesspeople
Australian farmers
People from Islington (district)